The 2001 Scottish League Cup final was played on 18 March 2001 at Hampden Park in Glasgow and was the final of the 54th Scottish League Cup. The final was contested by Celtic and Kilmarnock. Celtic won the match 3–0, thanks to a Henrik Larsson hat-trick.

Match details

Teams

References

2001
League Cup Final
Scottish League Cup Final 2001
Scottish League Cup Final 2001
2000s in Glasgow